Sutton Coldfield Town railway station, also referred to as Sutton Town, was a railway station in Sutton Coldfield, Birmingham, England, on the Midland Railway's Sutton Park Line.

History
The station was opened as Sutton Coldfield on 1 July 1879, and was renamed to Sutton Coldfield Town on 1 May 1882. On 1 April 1904 the name reverted to Sutton Coldfield. It was renamed again to Sutton Coldfield Town on 2 June 1924, but closed to passengers on 1 January 1925.

The line remains open for freight trains.

References

Disused railway stations in Birmingham, West Midlands
Railway stations in Great Britain opened in 1879
Railway stations in Great Britain closed in 1925
Former Midland Railway stations